Doring River Dam is an earth-fill type dam on the Doring River, near Indwe, Eastern Cape, South Africa. It was established in 1971. Primarily it serves for domestic use and industrial purposes and its hazard potential has been ranked high.

See also
List of reservoirs and dams in South Africa
List of rivers of South Africa

References 

 List of South African Dams from the Department of Water Affairs and Forestry (South Africa)

Dams in South Africa
Dams completed in 1971